The Ambassador of Italy in Belgium (in French: ambassadeur d'Italie en Belgique, in Dutch: ambassadeur van Italië in België) is the head of the diplomatic mission of the Italian Republic in the Kingdom of Belgium. The current ambassador, in charge since 4 April 2020 the ambassador of Italy in Belgium is Francesco Genuardi.

List

References

External links 

 Official website of the Italian Embassy in Brussels, on ambbruxelles.esteri.it.

Belgium
Italy
Ambassadors of Italy to Belgium